Funkier Than a Mosquito's Tweeter is a 2002 compilation album by Ike & Tina Turner released on Stateside Records. The songs were originally recorded from 1969 to 1974 from the albums Come Together (1970), Working Together (1970), 'Nuff Said (1971), Feel Good (1972), and Let Me Touch Your Mind (1973).

Track listing

References

Ike & Tina Turner compilation albums
2002 compilation albums
Albums produced by Ike Turner
EMI Records compilation albums